Relations between Canada and the United States have historically been extensive, given the two countries' shared origins and border, which is the longest in the world. Starting with the American Revolution, when Loyalists fled to Canada, a vocal element in Canada has warned against American dominance or annexation. The War of 1812 saw invasions across the border in both directions, but the war ended with unchanged borders. The border was demilitarized, as was the Great Lakes region. The British ceased aiding Native American attacks on the United States, and the United States never again attempted to invade Canada. Apart from minor unsuccessful raids, it has remained peaceful.

As Britain decided to disengage, fears of an American takeover played a role in the Canadian Confederation (1867), and Canada's rejection of free trade (1911). Military collaboration was close during World War II and continued throughout the Cold War, bilaterally through NORAD and multilaterally through NATO. A high volume of trade and migration continues between the two nations, as well as a heavy overlapping of popular and elite culture; a dynamic which has generated closer ties, especially after the signing of the Canada–United States Free Trade Agreement in 1988.

The two nations have the world's longest shared border, and also have significant military interoperability. Recent difficulties have included repeated trade disputes, environmental concerns, Canadian concern for the future of oil exports, the issue of illegal immigration and the threat of terrorism. Trade has continued to expand, especially following the 1988 FTA, the 1994 North American Free Trade Agreement (NAFTA), and the 2020 United States–Mexico–Canada Agreement (USMCA), which has progressively merged the two economies.
Co-operation on many fronts, such as the ease of the flow of goods, services, and people across borders are to be even more extended, as well as the establishment of joint border inspection agencies, relocation of U.S. food inspectors agents to Canadian plants and vice versa, greater sharing of intelligence, and harmonizing regulations on everything from food to manufactured goods, thus further increasing the American-Canadian assemblage.

The foreign policies of the countries have been closely aligned, yet ultimately independent, since the Cold War. For example, Canada maintains full relations with Cuba and declined to participate in the Vietnam War and the 2003 invasion of Iraq.  There is also diplomatic debate on whether the Northwest Passage is in international waters or under Canadian sovereignty.

History

Colonial wars

Before the British conquest of French Canada in 1760, there had been a series of wars between the British and the French which were fought out in the colonies as well as in Europe and the high seas. In general, the British heavily relied on American colonial militia units, while the French heavily relied on their First Nation allies. The Iroquois Nation were important allies of the British. Much of the fighting involved ambushes and small-scale warfare in the villages along the border between New England and Quebec. The New England colonies had a much larger population than Quebec, so major invasions came from south to north. The First Nation allies, only loosely controlled by the French, repeatedly raided New England villages to kidnap women and children, and torture and kill the men. Those who survived were brought up as Francophone Catholics. The tension along the border was exacerbated by religion, the French Catholics and English Protestants had a deep mutual distrust. There was a naval dimension as well, involving privateers attacking enemy merchant ships.

England seized Quebec from 1629 to 1632, and Acadia in 1613 and again from 1654 to 1670; These territories were returned to France by the peace treaties. The major wars were (to use American names), King William's War (1689–1697); Queen Anne's War (1702–1713); King George's War (1744–1748), and the French and Indian War (1755–1763). In Canada, as in Europe, this era is known as the Seven Years' War.

New England soldiers and sailors were critical to the successful British campaign to capture the French fortress of Louisbourg in 1745, and (after it had been returned by treaty) to capture it again in 1758.

American Revolutionary War

At the outset of the American Revolutionary War, the American revolutionaries hoped the French Canadians in Quebec and the Colonists in Nova Scotia would join their rebellion and they were pre-approved for joining the United States in the Articles of Confederation. 
When Canada was invaded, thousands joined the American cause and formed regiments that fought during the war; however most remained neutral and some joined the British effort. Britain advised the French Canadians that the British Empire already enshrined their rights in the Quebec Act, which the American colonies had viewed as one of the Intolerable Acts. The American invasion was a fiasco and Britain tightened its grip on its northern possessions; in 1777, a major British invasion into New York led to the surrender of the entire British army at Saratoga and led France to enter the war as an ally of the U.S. The French Canadians largely ignored France's appeals for solidarity. After the war Canada became a refuge for about 75,000 Loyalists who either wanted to leave the U.S. or were compelled by Patriot reprisals to do so.

Among the original Loyalists, there were 3,500 free African Americans. Most went to Nova Scotia and in 1792, 1200 migrated to Sierra Leone. About 2000 black slaves were brought in by Loyalist owners; they remained slaves in Canada until the Empire abolished slavery in 1833. Before 1860, about 30,000–40,000 black people entered Canada; many were already free and others were escaped slaves who came through the Underground Railroad.

War of 1812

The Treaty of Paris, which ended the war, called for British forces to vacate all their forts south of the Great Lakes border. Britain refused to do so, citing failure of the United States to provide financial restitution for Loyalists who had lost property in the war. The Jay Treaty in 1795 with Great Britain resolved that lingering issue and the British departed the forts. Thomas Jefferson saw the nearby British presence as a threat to the United States, and so he opposed the Jay Treaty, and it became one of the major political issues in the United States at the time. Thousands of Americans immigrated to Upper Canada (Ontario) from 1785 to 1812 to obtain cheaper land and better tax rates prevalent in that province; despite expectations that they would be loyal to the U.S. if a war broke out, in the event they were largely non-political.

Tensions mounted again after 1805, erupting into the War of 1812, when the United States declared war on Britain. The Americans were angered by British harassment of U.S. ships on the high seas and seizure of 6,000 sailors from American ships, severe restrictions against neutral American trade with France, and British support for hostile Native American tribes in Ohio and territories the U.S. had gained in 1783. American "honor" was an implicit issue. While the Americans could not hope to defeat the Royal Navy and control the seas, they could call on an army much larger than the British garrison in Canada, and so a land invasion of Canada was proposed as the most advantageous means of attacking the British Empire. Americans on the western frontier also hoped an invasion would bring an end to British support of Native American resistance to American expansion, typified by Tecumseh's coalition of tribes. Americans may also have wanted to acquire Canada.

Once war broke out, the American strategy was to seize Canada. There was some hope that settlers in western Canada—most of them recent immigrants from the U.S.—would welcome the chance to overthrow their British rulers. However, the American invasions were defeated primarily by British regulars with support from Native Americans and Upper Canada militia. Aided by the large Royal Navy, a series of British raids on the American coast were highly successful, culminating with an attack on Washington that resulted in the British burning of the White House, the Capitol, and other public buildings. At the end of the war, Britain's American Indian allies had largely been defeated, and the Americans controlled a strip of Western Ontario centered on Fort Malden. However, Britain held much of Maine, and, with the support of their remaining American Indian allies, huge areas of the Old Northwest, including Wisconsin and much of Michigan and Illinois. With the surrender of Napoleon in 1814, Britain ended naval policies that angered Americans; with the defeat of the Indian tribes, the threat to American expansion was ended. The upshot was both the United States and Canada asserted their sovereignty, Canada remained under British rule, and London and Washington had nothing more to fight over. The war was ended by the Treaty of Ghent, which took effect in February 1815. A series of postwar agreements further stabilized peaceful relations along the Canadian-US border. Canada reduced American immigration for fear of undue American influence, and built up the Anglican Church of Canada as a counterweight to the largely American Methodist and Baptist churches.

In later years, Anglophone Canadians, especially in Ontario, viewed the War of 1812 as a heroic and successful resistance against invasion and as a victory that defined them as a people. The myth that the Canadian militia had defeated the invasion almost single-handed, known logically as the "militia myth", became highly prevalent after the war, having been propounded by John Strachan, Anglican Bishop of York.

Post War of 1812 and mid-19th century
In the aftermath of the War of 1812, pro-British conservatives led by Anglican Bishop John Strachan took control in Ontario ("Upper Canada") and promoted the Anglican religion as opposed to the more republican Methodist and Baptist churches. A small interlocking elite, known as the Family Compact took full political control. Democracy, as practiced in the US, was ridiculed. The policies had the desired effect of deterring immigration from the United States. Revolts in favor of democracy in Ontario and Quebec ("Lower Canada") in 1837 were suppressed; many of the leaders fled to the US. The American policy was to largely ignore the rebellions, and indeed ignore Canada generally in favor of westward expansion of the American Frontier.

The Webster-Ashburton Treaty formalized the U.S.-Canada border in Maine, averting the Aroostook War.  During the Manifest Destiny era, the "Fifty-Four Forty or Fight" agenda called for U.S. annexation of what became Western Canada; the U.S. and Britain instead agreed to a boundary of the 49th parallel.  As harsher fugitive slave laws were passed, Canada became a destination for slaves escaping on the Underground Railroad.

American Civil War

Although the British Empire and Canada were neutral in the American Civil War, about 40,000 Canadians volunteered for the Union Army—many already lived in the U.S., and a few for the Confederate Army.  However, hundreds of Americans who were called up in the draft fled to Canada. In 1864, the Confederate government tried to use Canada as a base to attack American border towns. They raided the town St. Albans, Vermont on October 19, 1864, killing an American citizen and robbing three banks of over US$200,000. The three Confederates escaped to Canada where they were arrested but then released. Many Americans suspected – falsely – that the Canadian government knew of the raid ahead of time. There was widespread anger when the raiders were released by a local court in Canada. The American Secretary of State William H. Seward let the British government know, "it is impossible to consider those proceedings as either legal, just or friendly towards the United States."

Alabama claims

Americans were angry at the British role during the American Civil War. Some leaders demanded a huge payment, on the premise that British involvement had lengthened the war. Senator Charles Sumner, the chairman of the Senate Foreign Relations Committee, originally wanted to ask for $2 billion, or alternatively the ceding of all of Canada to the United States.

When American Secretary of State William H. Seward negotiated the Alaska Purchase with Russia in 1867, he intended it as the first step in a comprehensive plan to gain control of the entire northwest Pacific Coast. Seward was a firm believer in Manifest Destiny, primarily for its commercial advantages to the U.S., Seward expected British Columbia to seek annexation to the U.S. and thought Britain might accept this in exchange for the Alabama claims. Soon other elements endorsed annexation, Their plan was to annex British Columbia, Red River Colony (Manitoba), and Nova Scotia, in exchange for dropping the damage claims. The idea reached a peak in the spring and summer of 1870, with American expansionists, Canadian separatists, and Pro-American Englishmen seemingly combining forces. The plan was dropped for multiple reasons. London continued to stall, American commercial and financial groups pressed Washington for a quick settlement of the dispute on a cash basis, growing Canadian nationalist sentiment in British Columbia called for staying inside the British Empire, Congress became preoccupied with Reconstruction, and most Americans showed little interest in territorial expansion. The "Alabama Claims" dispute went to international arbitration. In one of the first major cases of arbitration, the tribunal in 1872 supported the American claims and ordered Britain to pay $15.5 million. Britain paid and the episode ended in peaceful relations.

Late 19th century

Canada became a self-governing dominion in 1867 in internal affairs while Britain controlled control of diplomacy and of defence policy. Prior to Confederation, there was an Oregon boundary dispute in which the Americans claimed the 54th degree latitude. The Oregon Treaty of 1846 largely resolved the issue, splitting the disputed territory - the northern half became British Columbia, and the southern half eventually formed the states of Washington and Oregon. 

Strained relations with America continued, however, due to a series of small-scale armed incursions called the "Fenian raids" conducted by Irish-American Civil War veterans across the border from 1866 to 1871 in an attempt to trade Canada for Irish independence. The American government, angry at Canadian tolerance of Confederate raiders during the American Civil War of 1861-1865, moved very slowly to disarm the Fenians. The Fenian raids were small-scale attacks carried out by the Fenian Brotherhood, an Irish Republican organization based among Irish Catholics in the United States. Targets included British Army forts, customs posts and other locations near the border. The raids were small, unsuccessful episodes in  1866, and again from 1870 to 1871. They aimed to bring pressure on Great Britain to withdraw from Ireland. None of these raids achieved their aims and all were quickly defeated by local Canadian forces.

The British government, in charge of diplomatic relations, protested cautiously, as Anglo-American relations were tense. Much of the tension was relieved as the Fenians faded away and in 1872 by the settlement of the Alabama Claims, when Britain paid the U.S. $15.5 million for war losses caused by warships built in Britain and sold to the Confederacy.

Disputes over ocean boundaries on Georges Bank and over fishing, whaling, and sealing rights in the Pacific were settled by international arbitration, setting an important precedent.

Early 20th century

Alaska boundary

A short-lived controversy was the Alaska boundary dispute, settled in favor of the United States in 1903. The issue was unimportant until the Klondike Gold Rush brought tens of thousands of men to Canada's Yukon, and they had to arrive through American ports. Canada needed its port and claimed that it had a legal right to a port near the present American town of Haines, Alaska. It would provide an all-Canadian route to the rich goldfields. The dispute was settled by arbitration, and the British delegate voted with the Americans—to the astonishment and disgust of Canadians who suddenly realized that Britain considered its relations with the United States paramount compared to those with Canada. The arbitration validated the status quo, but made Canada angry at London.

1907 saw a minor controversy over USS Nashville sailing into the Great Lakes via Canada without Canadian permission. To head off future embarrassments, in 1909 the two sides signed the International Boundary Waters Treaty and the International Joint Commission was established to manage the Great Lakes and keep them disarmed. It was amended in World War II to allow the building and training of warships.

Free trade rejected

Anti-Americanism reached a shrill peak in 1911 in Canada. The Liberal government in 1911 negotiated a Reciprocity treaty with the U.S. that would lower trade barriers. Canadian manufacturing interests were alarmed that free trade would allow the bigger and more efficient American factories to take their markets. The Conservatives made it a central campaign issue in the 1911 election, warning that it would be a "sell out" to the United States with economic annexation a special danger. The Conservative slogan was "No truck or trade with the Yankees", as they appealed to Canadian nationalism and nostalgia for the British Empire to win a major victory.

World War I
British Canadians were annoyed in 1914-16 when the United States insisted on neutrality and seemed to profit heavily while Canada was sacrificing its wealth and its youth.  However when the US finally declared war on Germany in April 1917, there was swift cooperation and friendly coordination, as one historian reports: Official co-operation between Canada and the United States—the pooling of grain, fuel, power, and transportation resources, the underwriting of a Canadian loan by bankers of New York—produced a good effect on the public mind. Canadian recruiting detachments were welcomed in the United States, while a reciprocal agreement was ratified to facilitate the return of draft-evaders. A Canadian War Mission was established at Washington, and in many other ways the activities of the two countries were coordinated for efficiency. Immigration regulations were relaxed and thousands of American farmhands crossed the border to assist in harvesting Canadian crops. Officially and publicly, at least, the two nations were on better terms than ever before in their history, and on the American side, this attitude extended through almost all classes of society.

Post-First World War
Canada demanded and received permission from London to send its own delegation to the Versailles Peace Talks in 1919, with the proviso that it sign the treaty under the British Empire. Canada subsequently took responsibility for its own foreign and military affairs in the 1920s. Its first ambassador to the United States, Vincent Massey, was named in 1927. The United States' first ambassador to Canada was William Phillips. Canada became an active member of the British Commonwealth, the League of Nations, and the World Court, none of which included the U.S.

In July 1923, as part of his Pacific Northwest tour and a week before his death, US President Warren Harding visited Vancouver, making him the first head of state of the United States to visit confederated Canada. The then Premier of British Columbia, John Oliver, and then mayor of Vancouver, Charles Tisdall, hosted a lunch in his honor at the Hotel Vancouver. Over 50,000 people heard Harding speak in Stanley Park. A monument to Harding designed by Charles Marega was unveiled in Stanley Park in 1925.

Relations with the United States were cordial until 1930 when Canada vehemently protested the new Smoot–Hawley Tariff Act by which the U.S. raised tariffs (taxes) on products imported from Canada. Canada retaliated with higher tariffs of its own against American products and moved toward more trade within the British Commonwealth. U.S.–Canadian trade fell 75% as the Great Depression dragged both countries down.

Down to the 1920s, the war and naval departments of both nations designed hypothetical war game scenarios on paper with the other as an enemy. These were routine training exercises; the departments were never told to get ready for a real war. In 1921, Canada developed Defence Scheme No. 1 for an attack on American cities and for forestalling an invasion by the United States until British reinforcements arrived. Through the later 1920s and 1930s, the United States Army War College developed a plan for a war with the British Empire waged largely on North American territory, in War Plan Red.

Herbert Hoover meeting in 1927 with British Ambassador Sir Esme Howard agreed on the "absurdity of contemplating the possibility of war between the United States and the British Empire."

In 1938, as the roots of World War II were set in motion, U.S. President Franklin Roosevelt gave a public speech at Queen's University in Kingston, Ontario, declaring that the United States would not sit idly by if another power tried to dominate Canada. Diplomats saw it as a clear warning to Germany not to attack Canada.

Second World War
The two nations cooperated closely in World War II, as both nations saw new levels of prosperity and a determination to defeat the Axis powers. Prime Minister William Lyon Mackenzie King and President Franklin D. Roosevelt were determined not to repeat the mistakes of their predecessors. They met in August 1940 at Ogdensburg, issuing a declaration calling for close cooperation, and formed the Permanent Joint Board on Defense (PJBD).

King sought to raise Canada's international visibility by hosting the August 1943 Quadrant conference in Quebec on military and political strategy; he was a gracious host but was kept out of the important meetings by Winston Churchill and Roosevelt.

Canada allowed the construction of the Alaska Highway and participated in the building of the atomic bomb. 49,000 Americans joined the RCAF (Canadian) or RAF (British) air forces through the Clayton Knight Committee, which had Roosevelt's permission to recruit in the U.S. in 1940–42.

American attempts in the mid-1930s to integrate British Columbia into a united West Coast military command had aroused Canadian opposition. Fearing a Japanese invasion of Canada's vulnerable British Columbia Coast, American officials urged the creation of a united military command for an eastern Pacific Ocean theater of war. Canadian leaders feared American imperialism and the loss of autonomy more than a Japanese invasion. In 1941, Canadians successfully argued within the PJBD for mutual cooperation rather than the unified command for the West Coast.

Newfoundland
The United States built large military bases in Newfoundland during World War II. At the time it was a British crown colony, having lost dominion status. The American spending ended the depression and brought new prosperity; Newfoundland's business community sought closer ties with the United States as expressed by the Economic Union Party. Ottawa took notice and wanted Newfoundland to join Canada, which it did after hotly contested referendums. There was little demand in the United States for the acquisition of Newfoundland, so the United States did not protest the British decision not to allow an American option on the Newfoundland referendum.

Cold War

Prime Minister William Lyon Mackenzie King, working closely with his Foreign Minister Louis St. Laurent, handled foreign relations 1945–48 in a cautious fashion. Canada donated money to the United Kingdom to help it rebuild; was elected to the UN Security Council; and helped design NATO. However, Mackenzie King rejected free trade with the United States, and decided not to play a role in the Berlin airlift.  Canada had been actively involved in the League of Nations, primarily because it could act separately from Britain. It played a modest role in the postwar formation of the United Nations, as well as the International Monetary Fund. It played a somewhat larger role in 1947 in designing the General Agreement on Tariffs and Trade. 
After the mid-20th century onwards, Canada and the United States became extremely close partners. Canada was a close ally of the United States during the Cold War.

Vietnam War resisters

While Canada openly accepted draft evaders and later deserters from the United States, there was never a serious international dispute due to Canada's actions, while Sweden's acceptance was heavily criticized by the United States. The issue of accepting American exiles became a local political debate in Canada that focused on Canada's sovereignty in its immigration law. The United States did not become involved because American politicians viewed Canada as a geographically close ally not worth disturbing.

Nixon Shock 1971

The United States had become Canada's largest market, and after the war, the Canadian economy became dependent on smooth trade flows with the United States so much that in 1971 when the United States enacted the "Nixon Shock" economic policies (including a 10% tariff on all imports) it put the Canadian government into a panic. Washington refused to exempt Canada from its 1971 New Economic Policy, so Trudeau saw a solution in closer economic ties with Europe.  Trudeau proposed a "Third Option" policy of diversifying Canada's trade and downgrading the importance of the American market. In a 1972 speech in Ottawa, Nixon declared the "special relationship" between Canada and the United States dead.

Relations deteriorated on many points in the Nixon years (1969–74), including trade disputes, defense agreements, energy, fishing, the environment, cultural imperialism, and foreign policy. They changed for the better when Trudeau and President Jimmy Carter (1977-1981) found a better rapport. The late 1970s saw a more sympathetic American attitude toward Canadian political and economic needs, the pardoning of draft evaders who had moved to Canada, and the passing of old such as the Watergate scandal and the Vietnam War. Canada more than ever welcomed American investments during "the stagflation" that hurt both nations.

1990s

The main issues in Canada–U.S. relations in the 1990s focused on the North American Free Trade Agreement, which was signed in 1994. It created a common market that by 2014 was worth $19 trillion, encompassed 470 million people, and had created millions of jobs. Wilson says, "Few dispute that NAFTA has produced
large and measurable gains for Canadian consumers, workers, and businesses." However, he adds, "NAFTA has fallen well short of expectations."

Migration history

From the 1750s to the 21st century, there has been an extensive mingling of the Canadian and American populations, with large movements in both directions.

New England Yankees settled large parts of Nova Scotia before 1775 and were neutral during the American Revolution. At the end of the American Revolution, about 75,000 United Empire Loyalists moved out of the new United States to Nova Scotia, New Brunswick, and the lands of Quebec, east and south of Montreal. From 1790 to 1812 many farmers moved from New York and New England into Upper Canada (mostly to Niagara, and the north shore of Lake Ontario). In the mid and late 19th century gold rushes attracted American prospectors, mostly to British Columbia after the Cariboo Gold Rush, Fraser Canyon Gold Rush, and later to the Yukon Territory. In the early 20th century, the opening of land blocks in the Prairie Provinces attracted many farmers from the American Midwest. Many Mennonites immigrated from Pennsylvania and formed their own colonies. In the 1890s some Mormons went north to form communities in Alberta after the Church of Jesus Christ of Latter-day Saints rejected plural marriage. The 1960s saw the arrival of about 50,000 draft-dodgers who opposed the Vietnam War.<ref>Renee Kasinsky, "Refugees from Militarism: Draft Age Americans in Canada (1976)</ref>

Canada was a way-station through which immigrants from other lands stopped for a while, ultimately heading to the U.S. In 1851–1951, 7.1 million people arrived in Canada (mostly from Continental Europe), and 6.6 million left Canada, most of them to the U.S. After 1850, the pace of industrialization and urbanization was much faster in the United States, drawing a wide range of immigrants from the North. By 1870, 1/6 of all the people born in Canada had moved to the United States, with the highest concentrations in New England, which was the destination of Francophone emigrants from Quebec and Anglophone emigrants from the Maritimes. It was common for people to move back and forth across the border, such as seasonal lumberjacks, entrepreneurs looking for larger markets, and families looking for jobs in the textile mills that paid much higher wages than in Canada.

The southward migration slacked off after 1890, as Canadian industry began a growth spurt. By then, the American frontier was closing, and thousands of farmers looking for fresh land moved from the United States north into the Prairie Provinces. The net result of the flows was that in 1901 there were 128,000 American-born residents in Canada (3.5% of the Canadian population) and 1.18 million Canadian-born residents in the United States (1.6% of the U.S. population).

In the late 19th and early 20th centuries, about 900,000 French Canadians moved to the U.S., with 395,000 residents there in 1900. Two-thirds went to mill towns in New England, where they formed distinctive ethnic communities. By the late 20th century, most had abandoned the French language (see New England French), but most kept the Catholic religion. About twice as many English Canadians came to the U.S., but they did not form distinctive ethnic settlements.

Relations between political executives
The executive of each country is represented differently. The President of the United States serves as both the head of state and head of government, and his "administration" is the executive, while the Prime Minister of Canada is head of government only, and his or her "government" or "ministry" directs the executive.

W.L. Mackenzie King and Franklin D. Roosevelt (October 1935 – April 1945)

In 1940, W.L. Mackenzie King and Franklin D. Roosevelt signed a defense pact, known as the Ogdensburg Agreement.  King hosted conferences for Churchill and Roosevelt, but did not participate in the talks.

Louis St. Laurent and Harry S. Truman (November 1948 – January 1953)
Prime Minister Laurent and President Truman were both anti-communist during the early years of the Cold War.

John G. Diefenbaker and Dwight Eisenhower (June 1957 –January 1961)

President Dwight Eisenhower (1952–1961) took pains to foster good relations with Progressive Conservative John Diefenbaker (1957–1963). That led to approval of plans to join together in NORAD, an integrated air defence system, in mid-1957. Relations with President John Kennedy were much less cordial.  Diefenbaker opposed apartheid in the South Africa and helped force it out of the Commonwealth of Nations. His indecision on whether to accept Bomarc nuclear missiles from the United States led to his government's downfall.

John G. Diefenbaker and John F. Kennedy (January 1961 – April 1963)
Diefenbaker and President John F. Kennedy did not get along well personally. This was evident in Diefenbaker's response to the Cuban Missile Crisis, where he did not support the United States. However, Diefenbaker's Minister of Defence went behind Diefenbaker's back and did send Canada's military to high alert given Canada’s legal treaty obligations, and in order to try and appease Kennedy.

Lester B. Pearson and Lyndon B. Johnson (November 1963 – April 1968)
In 1965, Prime Minister Lester B. Pearson gave a speech in Philadelphia criticizing American involvement in the Vietnam War. This infuriated Lyndon B. Johnson, who gave him a harsh talk, saying "You don't come here and piss on my rug".

Brian Mulroney and Ronald Reagan (September 1984 – January 1989)

Relations between Brian Mulroney and Ronald Reagan were famously close. This relationship resulted in negotiations for the Canada–United States Free Trade Agreement, and the U.S.–Canada Air Quality Agreement to reduce acid-rain-causing emissions, both major policy goals of Mulroney, that would be finalized under the presidency of George H. W. Bush. Mulroney delivered eulogies at the funerals of both Ronald Reagan and George H. W. Bush.

Jean Chrétien and Bill Clinton (November 1993 – January 2001)
Although Jean Chrétien was wary of appearing too close to President Bill Clinton, both men had a passion for golf. During a news conference with Prime Minister Chrétien in April 1997, President Clinton quipped "I don't know if any two world leaders have played golf together more than we have, but we meant to break a record". Their governments had many small trade quarrels over the Canadian content of American magazines, softwood lumber, and so on, but on the whole were quite friendly. Both leaders had run on reforming or abolishing NAFTA, but the agreement went ahead with the addition of environmental and labor side agreements. Crucially, the Clinton administration lent rhetorical support to Canadian unity during the 1995 referendum in Quebec on separation from Canada.

Jean Chrétien and George W. Bush (January 2001 – December 2003)

Relations between Chrétien and George W. Bush were strained throughout their overlapping times in office. Canada offered its full assistance to the U.S. as the September 11 attacks were unfolding. One tangible show of support was Operation Yellow Ribbon, in which more than 200 U.S.-bound flights were diverted to Canada after the U.S. shutdown their airspace. Later however, Chrétien publicly mused that U.S. foreign policy might be part of the "root causes" of terrorism. Some Americans criticized his "smug moralism", and Chrétien's public refusal to support the 2003 Iraq war was met with negative responses in the United States, especially among conservatives.

Stephen Harper and George W. Bush (February 2006 – January 2009)
Stephen Harper and George W. Bush were thought to share warm personal relations and also close ties between their administrations. Because Bush was so unpopular among liberals in Canada (particularly in the media), this was underplayed by the Harper government.

Shortly after being congratulated by Bush for his victory in February 2006, Harper rebuked U.S. ambassador to Canada David Wilkins for criticizing the Conservatives' plans to assert Canada's sovereignty over the Arctic Ocean waters with military force.

Stephen Harper and Barack Obama (January 2009 – November 2015)

President Barack Obama's first international trip was to Canada on February 19, 2009, thereby sending a strong message of peace and cooperation. With the exception of Canadian lobbying against "Buy American" provisions in the U.S. stimulus package, relations between the two administrations were smooth.

They also held friendly bets on hockey games during the Winter Olympic season. In the 2010 Winter Olympics hosted by Canada in Vancouver, Canada defeated the US in both gold medal matches, entitling Stephen Harper to receive a case of Molson Canadian beer from Barack Obama; in reverse, if Canada had lost, Harper would have provided a case of Yuengling beer to Obama. During the 2014 Winter Olympics, alongside U.S. Secretary of State John Kerry & Minister of Foreign Affairs John Baird, Stephen Harper was given a case of Samuel Adams beer by Obama for the Canadian gold medal victory over the US in women's hockey, and the semi-final victory over the US in men's hockey.

Canada-United States Regulatory Cooperation Council (RCC) (2011)
On February 4, 2011, Harper and Obama issued a "Declaration on a Shared Vision for Perimeter Security and Economic Competitiveness" and announced the creation of the Canada–United States Regulatory Cooperation Council (RCC) "to increase regulatory transparency and coordination between the two countries."

Health Canada and the United States Food and Drug Administration (FDA) under the RCC mandate, undertook the "first of its kind" initiative by selecting "as its first area of alignment common cold indications for certain over-the-counter antihistamine ingredients (GC January 10, 2013)."

On December 7, 2011, Harper flew to Washington, met with Obama and signed an agreement to implement the joint action plans that had been developed since the initial meeting in February. The plans called on both countries to spend more on border infrastructure, share more information on people who cross the border, and acknowledge more of each other's safety and security inspection on third-country traffic. An editorial in The Globe and Mail praised the agreement for giving Canada the ability to track whether failed refugee claimants have left Canada via the U.S. and for eliminating "duplicated baggage screenings on connecting flights". The agreement is not a legally binding treaty, and relies on the political will and ability of the executives of both governments to implement the terms of the agreement. These types of executive agreements are routine—on both sides of the Canada–U.S. border.

Justin Trudeau and Barack Obama (November 2015 – January 2017)

President Barack Obama and Prime Minister Justin Trudeau first met formally at the APEC summit meeting in Manila, Philippines in November 2015, nearly a week after the latter was sworn into the office. Both leaders expressed eagerness for increased cooperation and coordination between the two countries during the course of Trudeau's government with Trudeau promising an "enhanced Canada–U.S. partnership".

On November 6, 2015, Obama announced the U.S. State Department's rejection of the proposed Keystone XL pipeline, the fourth phase of the Keystone oil pipeline system running between Canada and the United States, to which Trudeau expressed disappointment but said that the rejection would not damage Canada–U.S. relations and would instead provide a "fresh start" to strengthening ties through cooperation and coordination, saying that "the Canada–U.S. relationship is much bigger than any one project." Obama has since praised Trudeau's efforts to prioritize the reduction of climate change, calling it "extraordinarily helpful" to establish a worldwide consensus on addressing the issue.

Although Trudeau has told Obama his plans to withdraw Canada's McDonnell Douglas CF-18 Hornet jets assisting in the American-led intervention against ISIL, Trudeau said that Canada will still "do more than its part" in combating the terrorist group by increasing the number of Canadian special forces members training and fighting on ground in Iraq and Syria.

Trudeau visited the White House for an official visit and state dinner on March 10, 2016. Trudeau and Obama were reported to have shared warm personal relations during the visit, making humorous remarks about which country was better at hockey and which country had better beer. Obama complimented Trudeau's 2015 election campaign for its "message of hope and change" and "positive and optimistic vision". Obama and Trudeau also held "productive" discussions on climate change and relations between the two countries, and Trudeau invited Obama to speak in the Canadian parliament in Ottawa later in the year.

Justin Trudeau and Donald Trump (January 2017 – January 2021)

Following the victory of Donald Trump in the 2016 U.S. presidential election, Trudeau congratulated him and invited him to visit Canada at the "earliest opportunity." Prime Minister Trudeau and President Trump formally met for the first time at the White House on February 13, 2017, nearly a month after Trump was sworn into the office. Trump has ruffled relations with Canada with tariffs on softwood lumber. Diafiltered Milk was brought up by Trump as an area that needed negotiating.

In 2018, Trump and Trudeau negotiated the United States–Mexico–Canada Agreement (USMCA), a free trade agreement concluded between Canada, Mexico, and the United States that succeeded the North American Free Trade Agreement (NAFTA). The agreement has been characterized as "NAFTA 2.0," or "New NAFTA," since many provisions from NAFTA were incorporated and its changes were seen as largely incremental. On July 1, 2020, the USMCA entered into force in all member states.

In June 2018, after Trudeau explained that Canadians would not be "pushed around" by the Trump tariffs on Canada's aluminum and steel, Trump labelled Trudeau as "dishonest" and "meek", and accused Trudeau of making "false statements", although it is unclear which statements Trump was referring to. Trump's adviser on trade, Peter Navarro, said that there was a "special place in hell" for Trudeau as he employed "bad faith diplomacy with President Donald J. Trump and then tries to stab him in the back on the way out the door ... that comes right from Air Force One." Days later, Trump said that Trudeau's comments are "going to cost a lot of money for the people of Canada".

In June 2019, the U.S. State Department spokesperson Morgan Ortagus said the US "view Canada’s claim that the waters of the Northwest Passage are internal waters of Canada as inconsistent with international law."

Justin Trudeau and Joe Biden (January 2021 – present)

Following the victory of Joe Biden in the 2020 U.S. presidential election, Trudeau congratulated him on his successful victory; indicating a significant improvement in Canada-U.S. relationships, which had been strained in the years prior during the Presidency of Donald Trump.

On January 22, 2021, Biden and Trudeau held their first phone call. Trudeau was the first foreign leader to receive a phone call from Biden as President.

On February 23, 2021, Biden and Trudeau held their first bilateral meeting. Although virtual, the bilateral meeting was Biden's first as President. The two leaders discussed "COVID-19, economic recovery, climate change, and refugees and migration" among other subjects.

Military and security

The Canadian military, like forces of other NATO countries, fought alongside the United States in most major conflicts since World War II, including the Korean War, the Gulf War, the Kosovo War, and most recently the war in Afghanistan. The main exceptions to this were the Canadian government's opposition to the Vietnam War and the Iraq War, which caused some brief diplomatic tensions. Despite these issues, military relations have remained close.

American defense arrangements with Canada are more extensive than with any other country. The Permanent Joint Board of Defense, established in 1940, provides policy-level consultation on bilateral defense matters. The United States and Canada share North Atlantic Treaty Organization (NATO) mutual security commitments. In addition, American and Canadian military forces have cooperated since 1958 on continental air defense within the framework of the North American Aerospace Defense Command (NORAD). Canadian forces have provided indirect support for the American invasion of Iraq that began in 2003. Moreover, interoperability with the American armed forces has been a guiding principle of Canadian military force structuring and doctrine since the end of the Cold War. Canadian navy frigates, for instance, integrate seamlessly into American carrier battle groups.

In commemoration of the 200th Anniversary of the War of 1812 ambassadors from Canada and the US, and naval officers from both countries gathered at the Pritzker Military Library on August 17, 2012, for a panel discussion on Canada-US relations with emphasis on national security-related matters. Also as part of the commemoration, the navies of both countries sailed together throughout the Great Lakes region.

According to Canadian and U.S. officials,  a U.S. fighter jet shot down an unidentified object over Canada on 23 February 2023 on the orders of Prime Minister Justin Trudeau. The operation was coordinated by the North American Aerospace Defense Command (NORAD), a joint U.S.-Canadian air defense organization. Prime Minister Trudeau said investigators were looking for debris. This decision was made following the conversation between Biden and Trudeau.

Iran hostage crisis

During the 1979 revolution, protesters invaded the US embassy and took many hostages. Canada helped the US after a US military mission to get them out of Iran failed. 
Ken Taylor, Canadian diplomats and Flora MacDonald, Canadian Secretary of State for External Affairs, and Canadian Prime Minister Joe Clark decided to smuggle the six Americans out of Iran on an international flight by using Canadian passports for them. To do so, an Order in Council was made to issue multiple official copies of Canadian passports, with various fake identities, to the American diplomats in the Canadian sanctuary. The passports that were issued contained a set of forged Iranian visas prepared by the US Central Intelligence Agency to be used in an attempt to escape from Iran.

War in Afghanistan

Canada's elite JTF2 unit joined American special forces in Afghanistan shortly after the al-Qaida attacks on September 11, 2001. Canadian forces joined the multinational coalition in Operation Anaconda in January 2002. On April 18, 2002, an American pilot bombed Canadian forces involved in a training exercise, killing four and wounding eight Canadians. A joint American-Canadian inquiry determined the cause of the incident to be pilot error, in which the pilot interpreted ground fire as an attack; the pilot ignored orders that he felt were "second-guessing" his field tactical decision. Canadian forces assumed a six-month command rotation of the International Security Assistance Force in 2003; in 2005, Canadians assumed operational command of the multi-national Brigade in Kandahar, with 2,300 troops, and supervises the Provincial Reconstruction Team in Kandahar, where al-Qaida forces are most active. Canada has also deployed naval forces in the Persian Gulf since 1991 in support of the UN Gulf Multinational Interdiction Force.

The Canadian Embassy in Washington, D.C. maintains a public relations website named CanadianAlly.com, which is intended "to give American citizens a better sense of the scope of Canada's role in North American and Global Security and the War on Terror".

The New Democratic Party and some recent Liberal leadership candidates have expressed opposition to Canada's expanded role in the Afghan conflict on the ground that it is inconsistent with Canada's historic role (since the Second World War) of peacekeeping operations.

2003 Invasion of Iraq

According to contemporary polls, 71% of Canadians were opposed to the 2003 invasion of Iraq. Many Canadians, and the former Liberal Cabinet headed by Paul Martin (as well as many Americans such as Bill Clinton and Barack Obama), made a policy distinction between conflicts in Afghanistan and Iraq, unlike the Bush Doctrine, which linked these together in a "Global war on terror".

 Responding to ISIS/Daesh 

Canada has been involved in international responses to the threats from Daesh/ISIS/ISIL in Syria and Iraq, and is a member of the Global Coalition to Counter Daesh. In October 2016, Foreign Affairs Minister Dion and National Defence Minister Sajjan met the U.S. special envoy for this coalition. The Americans thanked Canada "for the role of Canadian Armed Forces (CAF) in providing training and assistance to Iraqi security forces, as well as the CAF's role in improving essential capacity-building capabilities with regional forces."

Illicit drugs

In 2003, the American government became concerned when members of the Canadian government announced plans to decriminalize marijuana. David Murray, an assistant to U.S. Drug Czar John P. Walters, said in a CBC interview that, "We would have to respond. We would be forced to respond." However, the election of the Conservative Party in early 2006 halted the liberalization of marijuana laws until the Liberal Party of Canada legalised recreational cannabis use in 2018.

A 2007 joint report by American and Canadian officials on cross-border drug smuggling indicated that, despite their best efforts, "drug trafficking still occurs in significant quantities in both directions across the border. The principal illicit substances smuggled across our shared border are MDMA (Ecstasy), cocaine, and marijuana." The report indicated that Canada was a major producer of Ecstasy and marijuana for the U.S. market, while the U.S. was a transit country for cocaine entering Canada.

Trade

Canada and the United States have the world's second largest trading relationship, with huge quantities of goods and people flowing across the border each year. Since the 1987 Canada–United States Free Trade Agreement, there have been no tariffs on most goods passed between the two countries.

In the course of the softwood lumber dispute, the U.S. has placed tariffs on Canadian softwood lumber because of what it argues is an unfair Canadian government subsidy, a claim which Canada disputes. The dispute has cycled through several agreements and arbitration cases. Other notable disputes include the Canadian Wheat Board, and Canadian cultural protectionism in cultural industries such as magazines, radio, and television. Canadians have been criticized about such things as the ban on beef since a case of Mad Cow disease was discovered in 2003 in cows from the United States (and a few subsequent cases) and the high American agricultural subsidies. Concerns in Canada also run high over aspects of the North American Free Trade Agreement (NAFTA) such as Chapter 11.

Environmental issues

A principal instrument of this cooperation is the International Joint Commission (IJC), established as part of the Boundary Waters Treaty of 1909 to resolve differences and promote international cooperation on boundary waters. The Great Lakes Water Quality Agreement of 1972 is another historic example of joint cooperation in controlling trans-border water pollution. However, there have been some disputes. Most recently, the Devil's Lake Outlet, a project instituted by North Dakota, has angered Manitobans who fear that their water may soon become polluted as a result of this project.

Beginning in 1986, the Canadian government of Brian Mulroney began pressing the Reagan administration for an "Acid Rain Treaty" in order to do something about U.S. industrial air pollution causing acid rain in Canada. The Reagan administration was hesitant, and questioned the science behind Mulroney's claims. However, Mulroney was able to prevail. The product was the signing and ratification of the Air Quality Agreement of 1991 by the first Bush administration. Under that treaty, the two governments consult semi-annually on trans-border air pollution, which has demonstrably reduced acid rain, and they have since signed an annex to the treaty dealing with ground level ozone in 2000. Despite this, trans-border air pollution remains an issue, particularly in the Great Lakes-St. Lawrence watershed during the summer. The main source of this trans-border pollution results from coal-fired power stations, most of them located in the Midwestern United States. As part of the negotiations to create NAFTA, Canada and the U.S. signed, along with Mexico, the North American Agreement on Environmental Cooperation which created the Commission for Environmental Cooperation which monitors environmental issues across the continent, publishing the North American Environmental Atlas as one aspect of its monitoring duties.

Currently neither of the countries' governments support the Kyoto Protocol, which set out time scheduled curbing of greenhouse gas emissions. Unlike the United States, Canada has ratified the agreement. Yet after ratification, due to internal political conflict within Canada, the Canadian government does not enforce the Kyoto Protocol, and has received criticism from environmental groups and from other governments for its climate change positions. In January 2011, the Canadian minister of the environment, Peter Kent, explicitly stated that the policy of his government with regards to greenhouse gas emissions reductions is to wait for the United States to act first, and then try to harmonize with that action – a position that has been condemned by environmentalists and Canadian nationalists, and as well as scientists and government think-tanks.

With large freshwater supplies in Canada and long-term concern about water scarcity in parts of the United States, water export availability or restriction has been identified as an issue of possible future contention between the countries.

Newfoundland fisheries dispute
The United States and Britain had a long-standing dispute about the rights of Americans fishing in the waters near Newfoundland. Before 1776, there was no question that American fishermen, mostly from Massachusetts, had rights to use the waters off Newfoundland. In the peace treaty negotiations of 1783, the Americans insisted on a statement of these rights. However, France, an American ally, disputed the American position because France had its own specified rights in the area and wanted them to be exclusive. The Treaty of Paris (1783) gave the Americans not rights, but rather "liberties" to fish within the territorial waters of British North America and to dry fish on certain coasts.

After the War of 1812, the Convention of 1818 between the United States and Britain specified exactly what liberties were involved. Canadian and Newfoundland fishermen contested these liberties in the 1830s and 1840s. The Canadian–American Reciprocity Treaty of 1854, and the Treaty of Washington of 1871 spelled-out the liberties in more detail. However the Treaty of Washington expired in 1885, and there was a continuous round of disputes over jurisdictions and liberties. Britain and the United States sent the issue to the Permanent Court of Arbitration in The Hague in 1909. It produced a compromise settlement that permanently ended the problems.

Common memberships
Canada and the United States both hold membership in a number of multinational organizations, including:

 Arctic Council
 Asia-Pacific Economic Cooperation
 Canadian Hockey League
 CONCACAF
 FIBA
 FIFA
 Food and Agriculture Organization
 G7
 G-10
 G-20 major economies
 International Chamber of Commerce
 International Development Association
 International Ice Hockey Federation
 International Monetary Fund
 International Olympic Committee
 Interpol
 Major League Baseball
 Major League Soccer
 National Basketball Association
 National Hockey League
 National Lacrosse League
 North American Free Trade Agreement
 North American Aerospace Defense Command
 North American Numbering Plan
 North Atlantic Treaty Organization
 Organization of American States
 Organisation for Economic Co-operation and Development
 Security and Prosperity Partnership of North America
 UKUSA Community
 United Nations
 UNESCO
 World Bowling
 World Health Organization
 World Trade Organization
 World Bank
 World Rugby

Territorial disputes

 
The two countries have had a number of territorial disputes throughout their histories. Current maritime territorial disputes between the two countries include the Beaufort Sea, Dixon Entrance, Strait of Juan de Fuca, San Juan Islands, Machias Seal Island, and North Rock. Additionally, the United States is one of several countries that contends the Northwest Passage is international waters; whereas the Canadian government asserts it forms Canadian Internal Waters. The Inside Passage is also disputed as international waters by the United States.

Historical boundary disputes include the Aroostook War at the Maine-New Brunswick border; the Oregon boundary dispute at the present day British Columbia-Washington border; and the Alaska Boundary Dispute at the Alaska-British Columbia border. The Maine-New Brunswick boundary dispute was resolved through the Webster–Ashburton Treaty in 1842, the Oregon boundary dispute through the Oregon Treaty of 1846, and the Alaska boundary dispute through arbitration in 1903.

Northwest Passage

A long-simmering dispute between Canada and the U.S. involves the issue of Canadian sovereignty over the Northwest Passage (the sea passages in the Arctic). Canada's assertion that the Northwest Passage represents internal (territorial) waters has been challenged by other countries, especially the U.S., which argue that these waters constitute an international strait (international waters). Canadians were alarmed when Americans drove the reinforced oil tanker  through the Northwest Passage in 1969, followed by the icebreaker Polar Sea in 1985, which actually resulted in a minor diplomatic incident. In 1970, the Canadian parliament enacted the Arctic Waters Pollution Prevention Act, which asserts Canadian regulatory control over pollution within a 100-mile zone. In response, the United States in 1970 stated, "We cannot accept the assertion of a Canadian claim that the Arctic waters are internal waters of Canada.... Such acceptance would jeopardize the freedom of navigation essential for United States naval activities worldwide." A compromise of sorts was reached in 1988, by an agreement on "Arctic Cooperation," which pledges that voyages of American icebreakers "will be undertaken with the consent of the Government of Canada." However the agreement did not alter either country's basic legal position. Paul Cellucci, the American ambassador to Canada, in 2005 suggested to Washington that it should recognize the straits as belonging to Canada. His advice was rejected and Harper took opposite positions. The U.S. opposes Harper's proposed plan to deploy military icebreakers in the Arctic to detect interlopers and assert Canadian sovereignty over those waters.

Views of presidents and prime ministers
Presidents and prime ministers typically make formal or informal statements that indicate the diplomatic policy of their administration. Diplomats and journalists at the time—and historians since—dissect the nuances and tone to detect the warmth or coolness of the relationship.
 Prime Minister John A. Macdonald, speaking at the beginning of the 1891 election (fought mostly over Canadian free trade with the United States), arguing against closer trade relations with the U.S. stated "As for myself, my course is clear. A British subject I was born—a British subject I will die. With my utmost effort, with my latest breath, will I oppose the ‘veiled treason’ which attempts by sordid means and mercenary proffers to lure our people from their allegiance." (February 3, 1891.)

Canada's first Prime Minister also said:

 Prime Minister John Sparrow Thompson, angry at failed trade talks in 1888, privately complained to his wife, Lady Thompson, that "These Yankee politicians are the lowest race of thieves in existence."
 After the World War II years of close military and economic cooperation, President Harry S. Truman said in 1947 that "Canada and the United States have reached the point where we can no longer think of each other as 'foreign' countries."
 President John F. Kennedy told Parliament in Ottawa in May 1961 that "Geography has made us neighbors. History has made us friends. Economics has made us partners. And necessity has made us allies. Those whom nature hath so joined together, let no man put asunder."
 President Lyndon Johnson helped open Expo '67 with an upbeat theme, saying that "We of the United States consider ourselves blessed. We have much to give thanks for. But the gift of providence we cherish most is that we were given as our neighbours on this wonderful continent the people and the nation of Canada." Remarks at Expo '67, Montreal, May 25, 1967.

 Prime Minister Pierre Elliot Trudeau famously said that being America's neighbour "is like sleeping with an elephant. No matter how friendly and even-tempered the beast, if one can call it that, one is affected by every twitch and grunt."J. L. Granatstein and Robert Bothwell, Pirouette: Pierre Trudeau and Canadian Foreign Policy(1991) p 51
 Prime Minister Pierre Elliot Trudeau, sharply at odds with the U.S. over Cold War policy, warned at a press conference in 1971 that the overwhelming American presence posed "a danger to our national identity from a cultural, economic and perhaps even military point of view."
 President Richard Nixon, in a speech to Parliament in 1972 was angry at Trudeau, declared that the "special relationship" between Canada and the United States was dead. "It is time for us to recognize," he stated, "that we have very separate identities; that we have significant differences; and that nobody's interests are furthered when these realities are obscured."
 In late 2001, President George W. Bush did not mention Canada during a speech in which he thanked a list of countries who had assisted in responding to the events of September 11, although Canada had provided military, financial, and other support. Ten years later, David Frum, one of President Bush's speechwriters, stated that it was an unintentional omission.
 Prime Minister Stephen Harper, in a statement congratulating Barack Obama on his inauguration, stated that "The United States remains Canada's most important ally, closest friend and largest trading partner and I look forward to working with President Obama and his administration as we build on this special relationship."
 President Barack Obama, speaking in Ottawa at his first official international visit on February 19, 2009, said, "I love this country. We could not have a better friend and ally."

Public opinion
Today there remain cross-border cultural ties  and according to Gallup's annual public opinion polls, Canada has consistently been Americans' favorite nation, with 96% of Americans viewing Canada favorably in 2012.Americans Give Record-High Ratings to Several U.S. Allies Gallup As of spring 2013, 64% of Canadians had a favorable view of the U.S. and 81% expressed confidence in then-US President Obama to do the right thing in international matters. According to the same poll, 30% viewed the U.S. negatively.  In addition, according to Spring 2017 Global Attitudes Survey, 43% of Canadians view the U.S. positively, while 51% hold a negative view. More recently, however, a poll in January 2018 showed Canadians' approval of U.S. leadership dropped by over 40 percentage points under President Donald Trump, in line with the view of residents of many other U.S. allied and neutral countries. Since then, Canadian opinion of the U.S. has improved significantly, following an international rebound in the U.S image abroad following the transition as President of the United States from Donald Trump to Joe Biden, with 61% of Canadians having a favorable opinion of the United States in 2021.

Anti-Americanism

Since the arrival of the Loyalists as refugees from the American Revolution in the 1780s, historians have identified a constant theme of Canadian fear of the United States and of "Americanization" or a cultural takeover. In the War of 1812, for example, the enthusiastic response by French militia to defend Lower Canada reflected, according to Heidler and Heidler (2004), "the fear of Americanization." Scholars have traced this attitude over time in Ontario and Quebec.

Canadian intellectuals who wrote about the U.S. in the first half of the 20th century identified America as the world center of modernity, and deplored it. Anti-American Canadians (who admired the British Empire) explained that Canada had narrowly escaped American conquest with its rejection of tradition, its worship of "progress" and technology, and its mass culture; they explained that Canada was much better because of its commitment to orderly government and societal harmony. There were a few ardent defenders of the nation to the south, notably liberal and socialist intellectuals such as F. R. Scott and Jean-Charles Harvey (1891–1967).

Looking at television, Collins (1990) finds that it is in Anglophone Canada that fear of cultural Americanization is most powerful, for there the attractions of the U.S. are strongest. Meren (2009) argues that after 1945, the emergence of Quebec nationalism and the desire to preserve French-Canadian cultural heritage led to growing anxiety regarding American cultural imperialism and Americanization. In 2006 surveys showed that 60 percent of Québécois had a fear of Americanization, while other surveys showed they preferred their current situation to that of the Americans in the realms of health care, quality of life as seniors, environmental quality, poverty, educational system, racism and standard of living. While agreeing that job opportunities are greater in America, 89 percent disagreed with the notion that they would rather be in the United States, and they were more likely to feel closer to English Canadians than to Americans. However, there is evidence that the elites and Quebec are much less fearful of Americanization, and much more open to economic integration than the general public.

The history has been traced in detail by a leading Canadian historian J.L. Granatstein in Yankee Go Home: Canadians and Anti-Americanism (1997). Current studies report the phenomenon persists. Two scholars report, "Anti-Americanism is alive and well in Canada today, strengthened by, among other things, disputes related to NAFTA, American involvement in the Middle East, and the ever-increasing Americanization of Canadian culture." Jamie Glazov writes, "More than anything else, Diefenbaker became the tragic victim of Canadian anti-Americanism, a sentiment the prime minister had fully embraced by 1962. [He was] unable to imagine himself (or his foreign policy) without enemies." Historian J. M. Bumsted says, "In its most extreme form, Canadian suspicion of the United States has led to outbreaks of overt anti-Americanism, usually spilling over against American residents in Canada." John R. Wennersten writes, "But at the heart of Canadian anti-Americanism lies a cultural bitterness that takes an American expatriate unaware. Canadians fear the American media's influence on their culture and talk critically about how Americans are exporting a culture of violence in its television programming and movies." However Kim Nossal points out that the Canadian variety is much milder than anti-Americanism in some other countries. By contrast Americans show very little knowledge or interest one way or the other regarding Canadian affairs. Canadian historian Frank Underhill, quoting Canadian playwright Merrill Denison summed it up: "Americans are benevolently ignorant about Canada, whereas Canadians are malevolently informed about the United States."

Canadian public opinion on U.S. presidents

United States President George W. Bush was "deeply disliked" by a majority of Canadians according to the Arizona Daily Sun. A 2004 poll found that more than two thirds of Canadians favoured Democrat John Kerry over Bush in the 2004 presidential election, with Bush's lowest approval ratings in Canada being in the province of Quebec where just 11% of the population supported him. Canadian public opinion of Barack Obama was significantly more positive. A 2012 poll found that 65% of Canadians would vote for Obama in the 2012 presidential election "if they could" while only 9% of Canadians would vote for his Republican opponent Mitt Romney. The same study found that 61% of Canadians felt that the Obama administration had been "good" for America, while only 12% felt it had been "bad". Similarly, a Pew Research poll conducted in June 2016 found that 83% of Canadians were "confident in Obama to do the right thing regarding world affairs". The study also found that a majority of members of all three major Canadian political parties supported Obama, and also found that Obama had slightly higher approval ratings in Canada in 2012 than he did in 2008. John Ibbitson of The Globe and Mail stated in 2012 that Canadians generally supported Democratic presidents over Republican presidents, citing how President Richard Nixon was "never liked" in Canada and that Canadians generally did not approve of Prime Minister Brian Mulroney's friendship with President Ronald Reagan.

A November 2016 poll found 82% of Canadians preferred Hillary Clinton over Donald Trump. A January 2017 poll found that 66% of Canadians "disapproved" of Donald Trump, with 23% approving of him and 11% being "unsure". The poll also found that only 18% of Canadians believed Trump's presidency would have a positive impact on Canada, while 63% believed it would have a negative effect. A July 2019 poll found 79% of Canadians preferred Joe Biden or Bernie Sanders over Trump. A Pew Research poll released in June 2021, showed that Canadian opinion of American president Joe Biden is much more favorable than his predecessor Donald Trump, with 77% approving of his leadership and having confidence in him to do the right thing.

Resident diplomatic missions

Resident diplomatic missions of Canada in the United States
 Washington, D.C. (Embassy)
 Atlanta (Consulate-General)
 Boston (Consulate-General)
 Chicago (Consulate-General)
 Dallas (Consulate-General)
 Denver (Consulate-General)
 Detroit (Consulate-General)
 Los Angeles (Consulate-General)
 Miami (Consulate-General)
 Minneapolis (Consulate-General)
 New York City (Consulate-General)
 San Francisco (Consulate-General)
 Seattle (Consulate-General)
 Houston (Trade Office)
 Palo Alto (Trade Office)
 San Diego (Trade Office)

Resident diplomatic missions of the United States in Canada
 Ottawa (Embassy)
 Calgary (Consulate-General)
 Halifax (Consulate-General)
 Montreal (Consulate-General)
 Quebec City (Consulate-General)
 Toronto (Consulate-General)
 Vancouver (Consulate-General)
 Winnipeg (Consulate)

See also

 American Canadians
 Canada–United States border
 Canada–United States sports rivalries
 Canadian Americans
 Canadian nationalism, in which autonomy from and contrast with the United States is a major issue
 Comparison of Canadian and American economies
 Comparison of the Canadian and American healthcare systems
 Foreign relations of Canada
 Foreign relations of the United States
 History of homeland security in the United States
 North Atlantic triangle
 Security and Prosperity Partnership of North America
 United Kingdom–United States relations
 List of ambassadors of Canada to the United States
 List of ambassadors of the United States to Canada

References

Cited sources
 

Further reading

 
 Azzi, Stephen. Reconcilable Differences: A History of Canada-US Relations (Oxford University Press, 2014)
 Behiels, Michael D. and Reginald C. Stuart, eds. Transnationalism: Canada-United States History into the Twenty-First Century (McGill-Queen's University Press, 2010) 312 pp. online 2012 review
 Bothwell, Robert. Your Country, My Country: A Unified History of the United States and Canada (2015), 400 pages; traces relations, shared values, and differences across the centuries
 Boyko, John. Cold fire: Kennedy's northern front (Alfred A. Knopf Canada, 2016)
 Congressional Research Service. Canada-U.S. Relations (Congressional Research Service, 2021) 2021 Report, by an agency of the U.S. Congress; Updated February 10, 2021
 Clarkson, Stephen. Uncle Sam and Us: Globalization, Neoconservatism and the Canadian State (University of Toronto Press, 2002)
 Doran, Charles F., and James Patrick Sewell, "Anti-Americanism in Canada," Annals of the American Academy of Political and Social Science, Vol. 497, Anti-Americanism: Origins and Context (May 1988), pp. 105–119 in JSTOR
 Dunning, William Archibald. The British Empire and the United States (1914) online celebratory study by leading American scholar.
 Dyment, David "Doing the Continental: A New Canadian-American Relationship" (Dundurn Press, 2010)
 Engler, Yves
 Granatstein, J. L. Yankee Go Home: Canadians and Anti-Americanism (1997)
 Granatstein, J. L. and Norman Hillmer, For Better or for Worse: Canada and the United States to the 1990s (1991)
 Gravelle, Timothy B. "Partisanship, Border Proximity, and Canadian Attitudes toward North American Integration." International Journal of Public Opinion Research (2014) 26#4 pp: 453–474.
 Gravelle, Timothy B. "Love Thy Neighbo (u) r? Political Attitudes, Proximity and the Mutual Perceptions of the Canadian and American Publics." Canadian Journal of Political Science (2014) 47#1 pp: 135–157.
 Greaves, Wilfrid. "Democracy, Donald Trump, and the Canada-US Security Environment." (NAADSN – North American and Arctic Defense Security Network, 2020). online
 
 Hale, Geoffrey. So Near Yet So Far: The Public and Hidden Worlds of Canada-US Relations (University of British Columbia Press, 2012); 352 pages focus on 2001–2011
 Holland, Kenneth. "The Canada–United States defence relationship: a partnership for the twenty-first century." Canadian Foreign Policy Journal ahead-of-print (2015): 1–6. online
 Holmes, Ken. "The Canadian Cognitive Bias and its Influence on Canada/US Relations." International Social Science Review (2015) 90#1 online.
 Holmes, John W. "Canadian External Policies since 1945" "International Journal" 18#2 (1963) 137-147.  https://doi.org/10.1177/002070206301800201 online
 Holmes, John W. "Impact of Domestic Political Factors on Canadian-American Relations: Canada," International Organization, Vol. 28, No. 4, Canada and the United States: Transnational and Transgovernmental Relations (Autumn, 1974), pp. 611–635 in JSTOR
 Innes, Hugh, ed. Americanization: Issues for the Seventies (McGraw-Hill Ryerson, 1972). ; re 1970s
 Keenleyside, Hugh Ll. Canada and the United States (1929) online
 Lennox, Patrick. At Home and Abroad: The Canada-U.S. Relationship and Canada's Place in the World (University of British Columbia Press; 2010) 192 pages; the post–World War II period.
 Little, John Michael. "Canada Discovered: Continentalist Perceptions of the Roosevelt Administration, 1939–1945," PhD dissertation. Dissertation Abstracts International, 1978, Vol. 38 Issue 9, p5696-5697
 Lumsden, Ian, ed. The Americanization of Canada, ed. for the University League for Social Reform (U of Toronto Press, 1970).  
 McInnis, Edgard W. The Unguarded Frontier: A History of American-Canadian Relations (1942) online; well-regarded older study 
 MacKenzie, Scott A. "But There Was No War: The Impossibility of a United States Invasion of Canada after the Civil War" American Review of Canadian Studies (2017): online

 McKercher, Asa. Camelot and Canada: Canadian-American Relations in the Kennedy Era (Oxford UP, 2016). xii, 298 pp. 1960-1963.
 Molloy, Patricia. Canada/US and Other Unfriendly Relations: Before and After 9/11 (Palgrave Macmillan; 2012) 192 pages; essays on various "myths"
 Mount, Graeme S. and Edelgard Mahant. Invisible and Inaudible in Washington: American Policies toward Canada during the Cold War (1999)
 Mount, Graeme S. and Edelgard Mahant. ''''An Introduction to Canadian-American Relations (2nd ed.1989)
 Myers, Phillip E. Dissolving Tensions: Rapprochement and Resolution in British-American-Canadian Relations in the Treaty of Washington Era, 1865–1914 (Kent State UP, 2015). x, 326 pp.
 Pacheco, Daniela Pereira. "Politics on Twitter: a comparison between Donald Trump and Justin Trudeau." (ICSCP 2020). online
 Paltiel, Jeremy. "Canada’s middle-power ambivalence: The palimpsest of US power under the Chinese shadow." in America’s Allies and the Decline of US Hegemony (Routledge, 2019) pp. 126-140.
 Pederson, William D. ed. A Companion to Franklin D. Roosevelt (2011)  pp 517–41, covers FDR's policies
 
 Stoett, Peter J. "Fairweather Friends? Canada–United States Environmental Relations in the Days of Trump and the Era of Climate Change." in Canada–US Relations (Palgrave Macmillan, Cham, 2019) pp. 105–123.
 Stuart, Reginald C. Dispersed Relations: Americans and Canadians in Upper North America (2007) excerpt and text search
 Tagg, James.. "'And, We Burned down the White House, Too': American History, Canadian Undergraduates, and Nationalism," The History Teacher, 37#3 (May 2004), pp. 309–334 in JSTOR
 Tansill, C. C. Canadian-American Relations, 1875–1911 (1943)
 Thompson, John Herd, and Stephen J. Randall. Canada and the United States: Ambivalent Allies (4th ed. McGill-Queen's UP, 2008), 387pp, the standard scholarly survey
 Wrong, Hume, and John W. Holmes. “The Canada-United States Relationship 1927/1951.” International Journal 31#3 (1976): 529–45. The Canada-United States Relationship 1927/1951 online

Trade and tariffs
 Ciuriak, Dan, How U.S. Trade Policy Has Changed Under President Donald Trump – Perceptions From Canada (SSRN, March 29, 2019). online or How U.S. Trade Policy Has Changed Under President Donald Trump – Perceptions From Canada
 Georges, Patrick. "Canada’s Trade Policy Options under Donald Trump: NAFTA’s rules of origin, Canada US security perimeter, and Canada’s geographical trade diversification opportunities." (Working Paper #1707E Department of Economics, University of Ottawa, 2017). online
 Grey, Earl. The Commercial Policy of the British Colonies and the McKinley Tariff (London: Macmillan, 1892). online
 Lawder, Robert H. Commerce between the United States & Canada, Observations on Reciprocity and the McKinley Tariff (Toronto: Monetary Times Printing, 1892). online
 Muirhead, Bruce. "From Special Relationship to Third Option: Canada, the U.S., and the Nixon Shock," American Review of Canadian Studies, Vol. 34, 2004
 Palen, Marc-William. "Protection, federation and union: The global impact of the McKinley tariff upon the British Empire, 1890–94." Journal of Imperial and Commonwealth History 38.3 (2010): 395-418 online.
 Rioux, Hubert. "Canada First vs. America First: Economic Nationalism and the Evolution of Canada-US Trade Relations." European Review of International Studies 6.3 (2019): 30-56. online

Primary sources
 Gallagher, Connell. "The Senator George D. Aiken Papers: Sources for the Study of Canadian-American Relations, 1930–1974." Archivaria 1#21 (1985) pp 176–79 online.

 Riddell, Walter A. ed. Documents on Canadian Foreign Policy, 1917–1939 Oxford University Press, 1962 806 pages of documents

External links
 History of Canada – U.S. relations
 Canadian Embassy in Washington, D.C.
 U.S. Embassy & Consulates in Canada
 Canadian Association of New York
 Canada and the United States, by Stephen Azzi and J.L. Granatstein 
 Canadian-American Relations, by John English 
 A New North American Neighborhood: The Alaskan Boundary Question and Canadian American Relations, 1898-1913 Manuscript at Dartmouth College Library

 
1927 in international relations
United States
Bilateral relations of the United States
Articles containing video clips